The word hydrolysis is applied to chemical reactions in which a substance reacts with water. In organic chemistry, the products of the reaction are usually molecular, being formed by combination with H and OH groups (e.g., hydrolysis of an ester to an alcohol and a carboxylic acid). In inorganic chemistry, the word most often applies to cations forming soluble hydroxide or oxide complexes with, in some cases, the formation of hydroxide and oxide precipitates.

Metal hydrolysis and associated equilibrium constant values

The hydrolysis reaction for a hydrated metal ion in aqueous solution can be written as:

p Mz+ + q H2O = Mp(OH)q(pz–q) + q H+

and the corresponding formation constant as:

and associated equilibria can be written as:

MOx(OH)z–2x(s) + z H+ = Mz+ + (z–x) H2O

MOx(OH)z–2x(s) + x H2O = Mz+ + z OH−

p MOx(OH)z–2x(s) + (pz–q) H+ = Mp(OH)q(pz–q) + (pz–px–q) H2O

Barium
Hydrolysis constants (log values) in critical compilations at infinite dilution and T = 298.15 K:

Beryllium
Hydrolysis constants (log values) in critical compilations at infinite dilution and T = 298.15 K:

Calcium
Hydrolysis constants (log values) in critical compilations at infinite dilution and T = 298.15 K:

Gadolinium
Hydrolysis constants (log values) in critical compilations at infinite dilution and T = 298.15 K:

Gallium
Hydrolysis constants (log values) in critical compilations at infinite dilution and T = 298.15 K:

Lithium
Hydrolysis constants (log values) in critical compilations at infinite dilution and T = 298.15 K:

Magnesium
Hydrolysis constants (log values) in critical compilations at infinite dilution and T = 298.15 K:

Potassium
Hydrolysis constants (log values) in critical compilations at infinite dilution and T = 298.15 K:

Radium
Hydrolysis constants (log values) in critical compilations at infinite dilution and T = 298.15 K:

Sodium
Hydrolysis constants (log values) in critical compilations at infinite dilution and T = 298.15 K:

Strontium
Hydrolysis constants (log values) in critical compilations at infinite dilution and T = 298.15 K:

References 

Equilibrium chemistry